Deltebre I is an archaeological site of a shipwreck belonging to an English army transport fleet which sank in the Ebro Delta with other ships of the same convoy in the summer of 1813. The lost ships were the Alfred, the Harlequin, the Magnum, and the Bonum Southampton.

See also 
 List of shipwrecks in 1813

References 

Archaeology of shipwrecks